Saint-Apollinaire (Airpro) Aerodrome  is located  west southwest of Saint-Apollinaire, Quebec, Canada.

References

Registered aerodromes in Chaudière-Appalaches